A total lunar eclipse took place on Tuesday, March 3, 1942. It was a central eclipse, with the moon passing through the darkest portion of the earth's umbral shadow.

Visibility

Related lunar eclipses

See also 
List of lunar eclipses and List of 21st-century lunar eclipses

External links 
 Saros series 122
 

1942-03
1942 in science
Central total lunar eclipses